The following highways are numbered 822:

United States
  Florida State Road 822
  County Road 822 (Broward County, Florida)
 Georgia State Route 822 (former)
  Louisiana Highway 822
  Maryland Route 822 (former)
  Maryland Route 822
  Nevada State Route 822
  Ohio State Route 822
  Puerto Rico Highway 822 (unbuilt)
 Virginia State Route 822 (1928-1933) (former)